Palmview is a rural/semi-rural and suburban locality in the Sunshine Coast Region, Queensland, Australia.

It is home to Aussie World.

History

Palmview is situated in the Gubbi Gubbi (Kabi) traditional Aboriginal country. 

With a history in logging and farming, the Palmview area had evolved with small acreage properties to the west of the Bruce Highway and the master-planned Harmony development to east.

Education
Palmview State Primary School is a (P-6) government primary school. Construction of the school commenced in 2020 in preparation for Prep to Year 6 student enrollment and commencement from 2021. Palmview State Special School, co-located with Palmview State Primary School is a government special education primary school with commencement and opening in 2021.

References

External links

 Aussie World & the Ettamogah Pub

Suburbs of the Sunshine Coast Region
Localities in Queensland